Ulochlaena is a genus of moths of the family Noctuidae.

Species
 Ulochlaena ferruginea Gaede, 1915
 Ulochlaena fumea (Hampson, 1902)
 Ulochlaena hirta (Hübner, [1813])
 Ulochlaena sagittata Gaede, 1915
 Ulochlaena schaeferi Gaede, 1915

References
Natural History Museum Lepidoptera genus database
Ulochlaena at funet

Cuculliinae